Futtocks End is a British comedy film released in 1970, directed by Bob Kellett and written by Ronnie Barker. Almost entirely without dialogue, the film includes a musical score, sound effects and incoherent mutterings. The story revolves around a weekend gathering at the decaying country home of the eccentric and lewd Sir Giles Futtock (Ronnie Barker) and the series of saucy mishaps between the staff and his guests.

Production and reception
It was filmed at Grim's Dyke, the former home of W. S. Gilbert, now a hotel.

In 1979 the film was infamously shown, with no prior announcement or explanation, by the BBC in the middle of that year's Miss World broadcast. The programme had in fact been affected by industrial action by sound engineers. Writing in The Observer, Clive James likened it to being "given a lolly to suck".

The film was released on DVD in June 2006 together with an audio commentary by the producer-director Bob Kellett. It was shown in Trafalgar Square as part of the 2007 St George's Day celebrations.

In 2021 a remastered edition of the film, together with Kellett's 2006 commentary and an 11-minute home movie edition, was released on the Blu-ray anthology Futtocks End and Other Short Stories. The "other short stories" referred to in the title are three other short films produced by Kellett: San Ferry Ann, A Home of Your Own (which also co-starred Barker, and is cited in Kellettt's commentary as an inspiration for Futtocks End), and Vive le Sport. All of these films are remastered in 2k from their original film elements.

The complete script appears in All I Ever Wrote by Ronnie Barker, as well as Fork Handles: The Bery Vest of Ronnie Barker (Ebury Press, 2013). The script contains some differences from the finished film. As Kellett explains in his commentary, dialogue during the establishing scenes was dropped in favour of an entirely wordless approach. A garden fête scene later in the script was omitted for budgetary reasons.

Cast
 Ronnie Barker - Sir Giles Futtock
 Michael Hordern - Hawk, the butler
 Roger Livesey -  Old Jack, the artist 
 Julian Orchard -  Lord Twist, the twit
 Kika Markham - Lesley, the niece
 Mary Merrall - Fern Brassett, the aunt
 Hilary Pritchard - Carol Singer, the photographic model 
 Peggy Ann Clifford - Cook 
 Richard O'Sullivan - The boots 
 Jennifer Cox - Effie, the parlour maid
 Suzanne Togni - Tweenie 
 Sammie Winmill - Tweenie 
 Kim Kee Lim - Oriental gentleman
 Aubrey Woods - The postman

Casting
Sir Giles Futtock is another variation on Barker's Lord Rustless character.

References

External links 

1970 films
1970 comedy films
British comedy films
Films directed by Bob Kellett
1970s British films